Oued Morra is a district in Laghouat Province, Algeria. It was named after its capital, Oued Morra.

Municipalities
The district is further divided into 2 municipalities:
Oued Morra
Oued M'Zi

References

Districts of Laghouat Province